There are four lakes in the U.S. state of Minnesota named Lake Agnes:

 Lake Agnes (Cook County, Minnesota)
 Lake Agnes (Douglas County, Minnesota)
 Lake Agnes (Boundary Waters)
 Lake Agnes (Voyageurs National Park)